Khin Maung Myint was the Minister for Construction of Myanmar (Burma). He is a retired Major General in the Myanmar Army. He resigned on 28 August 2012.

References

Government ministers of Myanmar
Burmese military personnel
People from Sagaing Region
1951 births
Living people
Defence Services Academy alumni
Burmese generals
Union Solidarity and Development Party politicians
Members of Pyithu Hluttaw